State Road 636 (SR 636) is a  state highway in Hardee County, Florida, that runs from U.S. Route 17 (US 17) and County Road 64A in Wauchula to SR 64 east of Wauchula.

Route description
State Road 636 begins at Sixth Avenue which is southbound US Route 17 (SR 35) and serves as the dividing line between north and south Avenues. One block later the road crosses South Fifth Avenue/North George Burris Avenue, and immediately after passing the former Atlantic Coast Line Railroad Depot on the northeast corner of that intersection has another intersection with northbound US 17/SR 35. Leaving downtown, the only other road resembling a major intersection is Griffin Road. The route still carries East Main Street as the street name even after crossing a bridge over the Peace River, as well as a slightly shorter bridge above an overflow creek. The rest of the route travels in a straight west to east line in a largely rural setting, though the number of paved intersection outnumber unpaved ones. East of Wells Road, State Road 636 terminates at Florida State Road 64, but eastbound SR 64 momentarily curves north in a T intersection with SR 636 when the route ends.

Major intersections

References

External links

FDOT Map of Hardee County (Including SR 636)

636
636